Nuclear export mediator factor (NEMF) is a protein that in humans is encoded by the NEMF gene.

Function

This gene encodes a component of the ribosome quality control complex. The encoded protein facilitates the recognition and ubiquitination of stalled 60S subunits by the ubiquitin ligase listerin. A similar protein in fly functions as a tumor suppressor.

References